The Core Socialist Values is a set of official interpretations of Chinese socialism promoted at the 18th National Congress of the Chinese Communist Party in 2012. The 12 values, written in 24 Chinese characters, are the national values of "prosperity", "democracy", "civility" and "harmony"; the social values of "freedom", "equality", "justice" and the "rule of law"; and the individual values of "patriotism", "dedication", "integrity" and "friendship".

Background 
In 1989, paramount leader Deng Xiaoping stated in a speech that he considered education to be the biggest reform failure of the 1980s, and in particular ideological and political education. The government had tried to effect mass campaigns to this end, but these would not ultimately be regarded as effective. The Death of Wang Yue in 2011 might be considered an instigator for a new program. In 2012, the building of a system of "Core Socialist Values" was proposed to address what was perceived as a moral crisis resulting from China's rapid economic development, which the People's Daily refers to as the "decayed, outdated ideals of mammonism and extreme individualism." At the 18th National Congress, Party general secretary Hu Jintao represented the 17th Central Committee and presented the content of the new values that are intended to be enshrined by the Chinese Communist Party (CCP).

A quote from CCP general secretary Xi Jinping at the Eighteenth National Congress says:

Program 
The program called for the local governments to "organize moral education campaigns", and for media organizations to "practice self-discipline". In addition, artists were asked to promote the values, while party members and state officials are expected to put these new values in practice. It also called on schools to incorporate them, with the Ministry of Education issuing a document in 2014 requesting all educational institutions promote them. Xi Jinping expressed in a high-level meeting that promotional campaigns for 'Core Socialist Values' should be thorough, to the extent that public support for Chinese-style socialism will be "as ubiquitous as the air". Another quote from 2014 further elaborates his position:

In 2016, Hunan Province officials responded to the campaign by organizing a series of dance routines to "spread the values" and express their support for the Communist Party.

To assess the effectiveness on how well the 'Core Socialist Values' are being promoted, a recent official survey conducted by Zhejiang Province reveals that 97.1% of the university students asked in 2016 are familiar with the subject. As for the general public, 75.2% acknowledge the importance of the subject, although only 35.7% of the respondents are familiar with the content that are being promoted by the central government.

In June 2017, the State Administration of Press, Publication, Radio, Film and Television issued several notices that intended to further restrict freedom of the press. One of the notices, with a patriotic bent, demanded broadcasters promote core values in their programs and "forcefully oppose" content that celebrates "money worship, hedonism, radical individualism and feudal thought."

Reception 
Shiyuan Hao considers the program of "great significance" for a "multi-national country like China", and for the creation of both a "harmonious culture" and a "creative breeding ground" for cultural diversity.

Michael Gow considers that, compelled to align its interests with the "broader interests of the Chinese people and different groups", the program for Core Socialist Values might best be analyzed as a shift from a focus on the economy to cultural power; or, if one wished to extrapolate, an attempt to cement legitimacy through the creation of a new cultural order, consent to which might be regarded as "essential for long-term social stability".

Liu Ruisheng, a researcher of the Chinese Academy of Social Sciences School of Journalism, criticizes the governments attempts more generally as simply lacking the same depth of value promotion in the west, which is "concealed" in the social sciences, education, religion, and entertainment, whereas the CCP presents ideology ad hoc. He is still pro-CCP however.

Academic Director Frank N. Pieke refers to the values as Confucian and as otherwise lacking any specifically Socialist content, but then as Michael Gow points out most Chinese do share a "broadly accepted, common-sense understanding of Confucian values."

List of Values 
The twelve Core Socialist Values are:

National values
 Prosperity
 Democracy
 Civility
 Harmony

Social values
 Freedom
 Equality
 Justice
 Rule of law

Individual values
 Patriotism
 Dedication
 Integrity
 Friendship

See also 
 Chinese Dream
 Eight Honors and Eight Shames
 Xi Jinping Thought
 Three Principles of the People

References

Further reading

External links 
 

Politics of China
Chinese culture
Ideology of the Chinese Communist Party
2010s in China
Socialism